"Can't Say How Much I Love You" is a song by Greek singer Demis Roussos. It was released as a single in 1976.

The song was included on Roussos' 1976 album Happy to Be....

Background and writing 
The song was written by Robert Rupen and P.D. Heaume. The recording was produced by Demis Roussos.

Commercial performance 
The single reached no. 35 in the UK.

Track listing 
7" single Philips 6042 114 (13 February 1976, UK)
 A. "Can't Say How Much I Love You" (2:32)
 B. "Bahia Blue" (2:34)

7" single Philips 6042 121 (1976, France, Netherlands, Portugal, etc.)
 A. "Can't Say How Much I Love You" (2:30)
 B. "This Time It Isn't Au-Revoir" (3:20)

Charts

References

External links 
 Demis Roussos — "Can't Say How Much I Love You" at Discogs

1976 songs
1976 singles
Demis Roussos songs
Philips Records singles
Song recordings produced by Demis Roussos